Elaine O'Connor (born 20 February 1982) is an Irish former football midfielder. O'Connor played for clubs including Arsenal and Long Island Lady Riders and represented the Republic of Ireland at senior international level.

Club career
O'Connor took up football aged seven and played for five years at Killinarden Community School. She came to prominence at Dublin Women's Soccer League club Lourdes Celtic, winning the Dublin Cup at Under-14, 16 and 18 level. Spells at other Dublin clubs Shelbourne and St Catherine's followed for O'Connor.

In 1999 an American soccer coach named JoAnne Wagner spotted O'Connor and signed her to Hofstra University. O'Connor remained for five seasons, redshirting in 2002, and majoring in Physical Education. She also featured in the W-League for Long Island Lady Riders. 

In 2004 O'Connor signed for Arsenal Ladies, making her debut in an FA Women's Community Shield defeat by Charlton Athletic. By 2005 O'Connor was back in America playing for Long Island Lady Riders. The following season she switched to Women's Premier Soccer League (WPSL) outfit Long Island Fury.

After her playing career O'Connor remained in the United States and worked as a teacher.

International career
O'Connor represented Republic of Ireland at youth level, then played for the senior team in the qualifying campaigns for the 2003 and 2007 FIFA Women's World Cups. She also played in the Euro 2009 qualifiers.

O'Connor was named Women's Senior International Player of the Year at the 2004 FAI International Football Awards. She won 54 caps for Ireland.

References

1982 births
Living people
Association footballers from County Dublin
Republic of Ireland women's association footballers
Arsenal W.F.C. players
Republic of Ireland women's international footballers
FA Women's National League players
Expatriate footballers in England
Shelbourne F.C. (women) players
St Catherine's L.F.C. players
Dublin Women's Soccer League players
Hofstra Pride women's soccer players
Women's association football midfielders
Republic of Ireland women's youth international footballers
Long Island Rough Riders (USL W League) players
USL W-League (1995–2015) players
Irish expatriate sportspeople in the United States
Expatriate women's soccer players in the United States
Women's Premier Soccer League players
People from Tallaght
Sportspeople from South Dublin (county)